The Copa Diego Armando Maradona Final was the final match to decide the champions of the 2020 Copa de la Liga Profesional (renamed "Copa Diego Armando Maradona"), the 1st edition of this national cup. It was played on 17 January 2021 at the Estadio San Juan del Bicentenario in San Juan between Boca Juniors and Banfield.

Boca Juniors won the match via a penalty shoot-out after the game had finished 1–1 and were crowned as champions of the cup. As Boca Juniors had already qualified for the 2021 Copa Libertadores, San Lorenzo (best team of the 2019–20 Superliga Argentina and 2020 Copa de la Superliga aggregate table not yet qualified) gained the 2021 Copa Libertadores berth (Regulations Article 4.2).

The runners-up Banfield won a qualifying play-off against Vélez Sarsfield, winners of the Fase Complementación, to decide which one would participate in the 2022 Copa Sudamericana (Regulations Article 4.7).

Qualified teams

Road to the final

Note: In all results below, the score of the finalist is given first (H: home; A: away).

Match

Details

Statistics

References

2021 in Argentine football
l
l